Strontium stearate is a metal-organic compound, a salt of strontium and stearic acid with the chemical formula . The compound is classified as a metallic soap, i.e. a metal derivative of a fatty acid.

Synthesis
A reaction of strontium hydroxide with stearic acid.

Physical properties
The compound forms white powder. Insoluble in alcohol, soluble (forms gel) in aliphatic and aromatic hydrocarbons.

Uses
Strontium stearate is used in greese and wax compounding.

Also as a lubricant to improve the flow characteristics of polyolefin resins.

References

Stearates
Strontium  compounds